Nam Dương may refer to several places in Vietnam, including:

Nam Dương, Đà Nẵng, a ward of Hải Châu District
Nam Dương, Bắc Giang, a commune of Lục Ngạn District
Nam Dương, Nam Định, a commune of Nam Trực District